Woakwine may refer to the following:

Woakwine, the original name proposal for the locality of Magarey, South Australia
Woakwine Conservation Park, a protected area in South Australia
Woakwine Conservation Reserve, the previous name for the Woakwine Conservation Park
Woakwine Range, a range of hills in South Australia

See also
Mount Woakwine, the original name proposal for the town of Mount Hope, South Australia
Woakwine Range Wind Farm, a proposed facility to be built on the Woakwine Range